University of Iowa Hospitals and Clinics (UIHC) is an 811-bed public teaching hospital and level 1 trauma center affiliated with the University of Iowa. UI Hospitals and Clinics is part of University of Iowa Health Care, a partnership that includes the University of Iowa Roy J. and Lucille A. Carver College of Medicine and the University of Iowa Physicians group practice.

It is located on the university campus in Iowa City, Iowa at Melrose Avenue and Hawkins Drive near Kinnick Stadium. At times during televised Hawkeye football games, the hospital can be seen in the background. The hospital is one of three in Iowa City, the others being Mercy Hospital and the Iowa City VA Health Care System, a VA medical center.

UI Hospitals and Clinics employs over 7,100 people and is overseen by the Iowa Board of Regents. It is Iowa's only comprehensive, tertiary-level center and also its premier medical facility. In addition to taking care of local patients, people throughout the state and region are often referred to the university's hospitals for treatment of serious or complex illnesses or injuries.

History
The University of Iowa began medical services in 1873 when its medical department entered into an agreement with the Sisters of Mercy to operate a small hospital in the community. Davenport, Iowa physician Washington Freeman Peck and other physicians raised $5,000 to renovate a vacant school building known as Mechanics Academy into a 20-bed hospital. This hospital had two open wards for both men and women, four private rooms, and a surgical amphitheater. Dr. Peck convinced the Mother Superior of the Davenport-based Sisters of Mercy to send nuns to Iowa City to help care for patients. This arrangement lasted until 1885, when the Sisters moved to a nearby vacant mission and opened Mercy Hospital one year later.

It soon became apparent that a new hospital was needed as the university was outgrowing its original facility. In 1896 the state of Iowa approved the needed appropriations. A 65-bed hospital was built in 1898 where the school's Seashore Hall is now located. This facility was state of the art at the time of its construction, with both electrical lighting and steam heating. The hospital featured a 200-seat amphitheater for instructional purposes.

Following passage of indigent care laws in 1928, patient admissions increased greatly. The current hospital was built in 1928 as a 735-bed hospital. At the time of its construction, the hospital building was one of the largest in the country.

Medical advances 
Numerous advances were pioneered at the University of Iowa Hospitals and Clinics:

In 1939, development of modern-day blood banking. Dr. Elmer L. DeGowin and his team were able to refrigerate, ship and use banked blood. 
In 1971, the world's first horizontal gastroplasty surgery for morbid obesity was performed at the hospital. 
In 1982, UI Hospitals and Clinics otolaryngologists were the first in the U.S. to implant a multichannel cochlear implant, a device meant to help deaf patients hear sounds that can be interpreted as speech.
 First research center to discover the gene for open-angle glaucoma.
 First hospital in the world to use robotic surgery for removal of an adrenal carcinoma (an aggressive deadly tumor) and an adrenal mass from a pediatric patient.
 World's smallest patient (Nissen fundoplication in a 5.7 pound infant) to undergo gastric reflux surgery using the da Vinci robotic surgical system.
 First hospital in the U.S. to perform digital breast tomosynthesis imaging, which allows physicians to "page through" the interior of the breast without the superimposition of the other tissues.
Development of the Ponseti method, a non-surgical method of correcting congenital clubfoot, which had previously been treated through surgeries to infants or children at a young age. The Ponseti method is a way to treat clubfoot through a series of manipulating bones and tendons in the foot and holding them in place through a series of casts. It is a treatment technique that is still used worldwide to this day.

Related institutions

Carver College of Medicine

The Carver College of Medicine is the medical school of the University of Iowa. The Carver College of Medicine can trace its roots back to the 1870s.

University of Iowa Stead Family Children's Hospital
University of Iowa Children's Hospital was founded in 1919. As Iowa's only comprehensive children's hospital, it provides care for children from birth to young adulthood. The new UI Stead Family Children's Hospital building opened in February 2017 and includes more than 170 pediatric doctors, surgeons, and dentists, and more than 500 specially trained pediatric nurses. It is the only nationally ranked children's hospital in Iowa, and is home to Iowa's only Level 4 NICU, Level 1 Trauma Center for pediatrics, pediatric dermatologists, pediatric genetics team, pediatric renal dialysis, pediatric rheumatologists, pediatric urologist, pediatric heart, kidney, liver, pancreas, and blood and bone marrow transplants. Patients come from every county in Iowa, nearly every state in the United States, and several international countries.

Affiliates
Recently in the mid-2010s, the hospital started an affiliate program with a slew of other hospitals across the state of Iowa. These include Genesis Medical Center and Mercy Hospital, among others. The University of Iowa hospital and Clinics has an office within the Genesis Medical Center building located on Middle Road in Bettendorf, Iowa.

Notes

External links
 University of Iowa Hospitals and Clinics
 The University of Iowa
 University of Iowa Stead Family Children's Hospital

Hospital buildings completed in 1898
Hospital buildings completed in 1928
Hospitals in Iowa
University of Iowa
Teaching hospitals in the United States
Hospitals established in 1898
Buildings and structures in Iowa City, Iowa
1898 establishments in Iowa